The men's team foil was a fencing event held as part of the fencing at the 1904 Summer Olympics program. It was the first time a team fencing event was held at the Olympics. 2 teams of 3 fencers each competed.

Results

Final

Each of the three fencers on each team faced all three of the other team's fencers.  The mixed team fencers won 7 of the 9 individual bouts, giving them the team victory.

Notes

References

 

Fencing at the 1904 Summer Olympics